Port McNeill Water Aerodrome  is located adjacent to Port McNeill, British Columbia, Canada.

See also
 List of airports on Vancouver Island

References

Seaplane bases in British Columbia
Regional District of Mount Waddington
Registered aerodromes in British Columbia